The Mussolini diaries are several forged diaries of Italy's former fascist leader Benito Mussolini. The two best known cases of forged Mussolini diaries are those of 1957 and 2007, but other forgeries have also been discovered.

1957 claim
During 1957 a mother and daughter (Amalia and Rosa Panvini) produced thirty volumes of what they later claimed were Mussolini's diaries; these diaries apparently fooled the dictator's son and an expert. At first it was believed that the large number of volumes in themselves were evidence that they were not forgeries; it was later discovered that these diaries had in fact been forged.

2007 claim
In February 2007, Italian senator Marcello Dell'Utri claimed that diaries, covering the years from 1935 to 1939 had been found. Moreover, he claimed in the newspaper Corriere della Sera, these Mussolini diaries were with a lawyer at Bellinzona, in the Italian-speaking part of Switzerland. He said he examined the diaries and found that the "handwriting is clear and recognisably" that of Mussolini, though "a bit hurried". Dell'Utri stated that his claim was supported by an unknown handwriting expert. He said further that the diaries had been found in a suitcase the dictator was carrying when he was caught by partisans in Dongo, at Lake Como, while he was fleeing to Switzerland in April 1945. The books had been hidden by one of the partisans who had died recently.

These diaries generated much interest among historians, as it appeared that Mussolini reluctantly brought Italy into World War II and that he had tried to prevent the war. The diaries were also received with scepticism as they had not been authenticated independently. This scepticism was made more acute by memories of the 1957 forgery and the forged Hitler diaries case in 1983.

Later in February two Italian historians, Emilio Gentile and Roberto Travaglini, independently discovered that these diaries had indeed been forged. The historians claimed that these diaries had been around for some time and that someone had tried to sell them to journalists, auction houses and publishing houses before offering them to Dell'Utri: they had already been offered to The Times in 1980, to Sotheby's in 1990, to Feltrinelli in 1992 and to L'Espresso in 2004, all of which rejected them as forgeries. According to Gentile, the diaries contain "historical errors" and that the authors "seem to have copied various articles from old newspapers", and according to Travaglini "there were too many elements that did not match up". 

Dell'Utri is the owner of the diaries and still claims them to be authentic. Then-Italian Prime Minister Silvio Berlusconi, who is a close friend to Dell'Utri, also claimed that they are authentic and went so far to quote them in a 2010 OSCE meeting in Paris. Several elements close to Berlusconi, such as editor Elisabetta Sgarbi or the right-wing newspaper Libero (which distributed copies of the books to its readers in 2011), have also tried to defend the authenticity of the diaries, despite scholarly agreement that they are a forgery.

See also
Hitler diaries, an article about the forged diaries of Hitler.

References

Diaries
Literary forgeries
Fraud
Benito Mussolini